Village Rhythm is a studio album by the American jazz saxophonist Joe Lovano recorded in 1988 and released on the Italian Soul Note label.

Reception 
The Allmusic review by Scott Yanow awarded the album 4 stars stating "By 1988, it was becoming increasingly obvious that tenor saxophonist Joe Lovano was on his way to becoming a major name in the jazz world... Lovano is heard throughout in his early prime, playing inventive and generally concise improvisations that were beginning to become distinctive".

Track listing 
All compositions by Joe Lovano except as indicated
 "Village Rhythm" – 6:22
 "Birds of Springtime Gone By" – 5:54
 "Dewey Said" – 6:16
 "Chelsea Rendez-Vous" – 5:36
 "Variations of a Theme" – 3:14
 "His Dreams" – 6:51
 "T'Was to Me Part 1: Celebration of Life Everlasting" – 2:46
 "T'Was to Me Part II: Theme" – 2:21
 "Sleepy Giant" – 5:56
 "Duke Ellington's Sound of Love" (Charles Mingus) – 4:51
 "Spirit of the Night" – 6:31
Recorded at Sound Ideas Studios in New York City on June 7, 8 & 9, 1988

Personnel 
 Joe Lovano – tenor saxophone, soprano saxophone
 Tom Harrell – trumpet 
 Kenny Werner – piano
 Marc Johnson – bass
 Paul Motian – drums

References

External links 
 

Black Saint/Soul Note live albums
Joe Lovano albums
1989 albums